The Journal of European Integration is a peer-reviewed academic journal publishing scholarly work on all aspects of the European integration process. The journal welcomes submissions from a variety of disciplinary or multidisciplinary perspectives, ranging from political science and political economy to public administration, law, history, sociology and cultural studies. The journal is based at Luiss University.

History 
The journal was initially published three times a year by the Centre d'Études et de Documentation Européennes (Université de Montréal, Canada). From January 1981, the journal was sponsored by the Canadian Council for European Affairs (Conseil Canadien des Affaires Européennes).

Since January 1998, it has been published by Routledge. The number of publications per year has risen to eight, including two or three special issues.

The current editorial board includes:

 Executive Editors: Prof. Dr. Thomas Christiansen (Luiss University, Rome) and Prof. Dr. Olivier Costa (CNRS/CEVIPOF, Paris and College of Europe, Bruges)
 Editors: Prof. Dr. Mai'a Cross (Northeastern University, Boston) and Prof. Dr. Ana Juncos (University of Bristol)
 Review Section Editor: Dr. Edoardo Bressanelli (Sant'Anna School of Advanced Studies, Pisa)
 Advisory Editor and Chair of the Advisory Board: Prof. Dr. Emil Kirchner (University of Essex)
 Editorial Manager: Giulia Gallinella (Luiss University, Rome)

Abstracting and indexing 
The journal is abstracted and indexed in:
 CSA Linguisitics and Language Behavior Abstracts
 CSA Social Services Abstracts
 CSA Sociological Abstracts
 CSA Worldwide Political Science Abstracts
 Current Contents/Social & Behavioral Sciences
 PAIS International
Scimago
 Social Sciences Citation Index
According to the Journal Citation Reports, the journal has a 2015 impact factor of 1.132, ranking it 58th out of 163 journals in the category "Political Science" and 28th out of 86 journals in the category "International Relations".

See also 
 List of political science journals
 List of international relations journals

References

External links 
 
LinkedIn

English-language journals
Political science journals
Publications established in 1977
Routledge academic journals
7 times per year journals
History of European integration